Roger-Arnould Rivière (21 March 1930 – 16 September 1959) was a French poet.

Rivière was born in Tarare, Rhône.  Despite not being unpopular among other people, he was disgusted with his looks (especially lips). His poetry both shows and hides this "ugliness". He was an admirer of Dylan Thomas and also Cesare Pavese, whose book he held in his hand when he committed suicide in Lyon by poisoning himself with gas.

Books 
Masques pour une Ordalie (Paragraphes, ed. Millas-Martin, 1953)
Poésies complètes (ed. Guy Chambelland, 1963; reprinted 1975), published after the author's death

References and external links 

 Roger-Arnould Rivière, PDF in French

1930 births
1959 suicides
Poètes maudits
20th-century French poets
French male poets
20th-century male writers
20th-century French male writers
1959 deaths
Suicides by gas
Suicides in France